George Manners-Sutton (1 August 1751 – 15 February 1804) was a British politician who sat in the House of Commons  from 1774 to 1804.

Manners-Sutton was the eldest son of Lord George Manners-Sutton and educated at Eton School and Trinity College, Cambridge. He succeeded his father in 1783, inheriting Kelham Hall near Newark.

He was returned as Member of Parliament for Newark from 1774 to 1780, and then for Grantham, a Manners family borough, until 1802, when he was returned for Bramber.

He died unmarried in 1804; his heir was his brother John Manners-Sutton.

References

1751 births
1804 deaths
People educated at Eton College
Alumni of Trinity College, Cambridge
Members of the Parliament of Great Britain for English constituencies
Members of the Parliament of the United Kingdom for English constituencies
British MPs 1774–1780
British MPs 1780–1784
British MPs 1784–1790
British MPs 1790–1796
British MPs 1796–1800
UK MPs 1801–1802
UK MPs 1802–1806
G